Floating Seeds Remixed is a remix album by English band Ozric Tentacles. It was released in 1999 on Snapper Music.
The album includes a variety of mixes, including Eat Static and System 7.

Track listing
 "Sunhair" (System 7 Stargate Mix) (08:33)
 "Pteranodon" (Halucinogen Remix) (08:53)
 "Neurochasm" (Sparky Lightbourne Burger Mix) (05:25)
 "Sploosh" (Youth and Simon's Hydrophonic Decimation) (07:10)
 "Afroclonk" (Space Raiders Dirty Mouse Mix) (05:55)
 "Strangeitude" (Eat Static Remix) (08:25)
 "Eternal Wheel" (Zion Train Remix) (07:22)
 "Meander" (DJ BNK Karum Mix) (08:27)
 "Wob Glass" (Will White Mix) (05:43)

Ozric Tentacles albums
1999 remix albums
Snapper Music remix albums